Sungurlu District is a district of the Çorum Province of Turkey. Its seat is the town of Sungurlu. Its area is 1,999 km2, and its population is 48,296 (2022).

Composition
There is one municipality in Sungurlu District:
 Sungurlu

There are 108 villages in Sungurlu District:

 Akçakoyunlu
 Akçalı
 Akdere
 Akpınar
 Alembeyli
 Arabaçayı
 Arıcı
 Arifegazili
 Aşağıbeşpınar
 Aşağıfındıklı
 Asayiş
 Ayağıbüyük
 Aydoğan
 Bağcılı
 Bağdatlı
 Bahşılı
 Balkaya
 Beşdam
 Beşkız
 Beylice
 Beyyurdu
 Boztepe
 Bozyayla
 Bunalan
 Büyükpolatlı
 Büyükincesu
 Çadırhüyük
 Çamoluk
 Çavuşçu
 Çavuşköy
 Çayan
 Çayyaka
 Çiçekli
 Çiçeklikeller
 Çingiller
 Çukurlu
 Çulhalı
 Dayıncık
 Demirşeyh
 Denizli
 Derekışla
 Dertli
 Ekmekçi
 Eşme
 Gafurlu
 Gökçam
 Gökçeköy
 Göller
 Gülderesi
 Güloluk
 Güvendik
 Hacıosman
 Hilalli
 İkizli
 İmirli
 İnegazili
 Kaledere
 Kalenderoğlu
 Kamışlı
 Karacabey
 Karaçay
 Karakaya
 Karakocalı
 Karaoğlu
 Kavşut
 Kemalli
 Kertme
 Kırankışla
 Kışlaköy
 Kızılcakışla
 Körkü
 Küçükpolatlı
 Küçükincesu
 Kula
 Kurbağlı
 Kuşçalı
 Kuzucak
 Mahmatlı
 Mehmetaliçiftliği
 Mehmetbeyli
 Muratkolu
 Oğlaközü
 Ortakışla
 Ortaköy
 Oyaca
 Salmanköy
 Saraycık
 Sarıcalar
 Sarıkaya
 Şekerhacılı
 Tatlı
 Terzili
 Tirkeş
 Tokullu
 Topuz
 Tuğcu
 Tuğlu
 Turgutlu
 Türkhacılarhanı
 Üçoluk
 Yarımsöğüt
 Yenihacılarhanı
 Yeşilova
 Yeşilyurt
 Yirce
 Yorgalı
 Yörüklü
 Yukarıbeşpınar

References

Districts of Çorum Province